Pickler is a surname. Notable people with the surname include:

Diana Pickler (born 1983), American heptathlete
Jeff Pickler (born 1976), American professional baseball coach
John Pickler (1844–1910), American politician
Kellie Pickler (born 1986), American country music singer, songwriter, actress and television personality
Nedra Pickler (born 1975), American national political journalist